The Drengots were a Norman family of mercenaries, one of the first to head to Southern Italy to fight in the service of the Lombards. They became the most prominent family after the Hautevilles.

Origins
The family came from Carreaux, near Avesnes-en-Bray, east of Rouen.
From Quarrelis or Quadrellis, the Latin for Carreaux, the family gets its alternate name of "de Quarrel". 

The first members of the family known are five brothers. Four of these accompanied their one exiled brother, Osmond, who had murdered one of Duke Richard I of Normandy's hunting companions.
Sources diverge as to just who among the brothers was leader on the trip to the south:
 Orderic Vitalis and William of Jumièges name Osmond;
 Ralph Glaber names Rudolph;
 Leo of Ostia, Amatus of Montecassino, and Adhemar of Chabannes name Gilbert Buatère.
According to most south Italian sources, this last was designated leader for the Battle of Cannae in 1018.
The remaining brothers were Asclettin and Ranulf, probably the younger sons.
Some sources, like Glaber, claim that the band of 250 Norman warriors stopped in Rome to meet Pope Benedict VIII.
They then moved on to one of the Lombard capitals: Salerno or Capua.
From there they joined with Melus of Bari, the leader of the Lombard rebels in Apulia.

Rise
The Drengot Normans were successful with Melus until their defeat at Cannae in 1018. After that the Emperor Henry II came down in 1022 and pacified the region, maintaining the status quo ante between Greek and Lombard, he donated to a nephew of Melus some land in the county of Comino, in the valley of the Garigliano. This nephew of Melus brought with him many of the Norman mercenaries, including the Drengots, excepting Rudolph, who returned with some men to Normandy. 

The Drengots did not rise to great heights under the elder sons, Gilbert dying at Cannae and Rudolph returning to France. It was the young, but ruthless, Ranulf who brought them to great heights. He happily employed his men in support of the ousted duke of Naples, Sergius IV, in 1029. When Sergius returned to power, he gave Ranulf not only his sister in marriage, but also the town and environs of Aversa. Ranulf immediately took to fortifying the hilltop town and the first Norman state in Italy was born. 

In 1042, Asclettin, who had thrown his lot in with the Hautevilles, was granted Acerenza in a twelvefold division of the conquest in Apulia.

Rule in Capua
By far the most significant event in the familial history of the Drengot clan was the conquest of the principality of Capua in 1058. In 1057, Pandulf VI died and Richard, the son of Asclettin, immediately besieged the city of Capua. It surrendered the next year, but Richard, though he took the princely title, left the city in the hands of its rightful prince, Landulf VIII, until 1062. 

Richard also established his suzerainty over Gaeta in 1058 and sent his son, Jordan, to take possession of the city in 1062, though this wasn't accomplished until 1064. Richard and Jordan worked to expand Drengot power to the north, in Latium and the Abruzzi. They formed the only counter to the power of the Hauteville, then conquering Calabria and Sicily. The papacy thus turned to the princes of Capua to defend them and Richard and Jordan became popemakers: they imposed, by military force, the papal candidates of Hildebrand and the Reformers. In 1077, Richard, then the equal of Robert Guiscard, began to besiege Naples, but died in 1078. Jordan did not continue the siege, but during his reign, the Drengot influence declined in proportion to that of the Hautevilles, who finished their conquests in Sicily and the expulsion of the Greeks from the peninsula. 

From 1092 to 1098, the Drengots were expelled from Capua by the Lombard citizenry. After their reinstallation, the dynasty declined more and more in relative power. They still attempted to defend the papacy, but to little success. They were forced to make submission to the duke of Apulia and then the king of Sicily. Robert II of Capua revolted against the latter and spent his life trying, with the aid of Emperor and Pope, to retake his principality, but to no avail. He died in 1156 and the Drengot power was completely broken.

Genealogy
The five known brothers and their descendants:
Gilbert Buatère (d.1018)
Osmond
Rudolph
Ranulf I, count of Aversa (1030-1045)
Asclettin, count of Acerenza
Asclettin, count of Aversa (1045)
Ranulf II
Richard
Robert, count of Alife and Caiazzo (1086-1115)
Ranulf III, count of Alife and Caiazzo (1108-1139) and duke of Apulia (1137-1139)
Robert
Richard, count of Rupecanina, today Raviscanina
Andrew, count of Rupecanina, today Raviscanina
Gilbert, lord of Solofra
Richard I, count of Aversa (1049-1078) and prince of Capua (1058-1078)
Jordan I, prince of Capua (1078-1090)
Richard II, prince of Capua (1090-1106)
Robert I, prince of Capua (1106-1120)
Richard III, prince of Capua (1120)
Jordan II, prince of Capua (1120-1127)
Robert II, prince of Capua (1127-1156)
Robert
Jordan, Byzantine sebastos
Jonathan, count of Carinola (d.1094)
Robert
Alexander
Drogo
Hubert

Ranulf Trincanocte, count of Aversa, was a son of a sibling of Asclettin of Acerenza. Whether this sibling was one of his known four brothers or another brother or a sister is unknown. He had a son Herman who was also count of Aversa.

Notes

Sources
European Commission presentation of The Normans Norman Heritage, 10th-12th century.
Norwich, John Julius. The Normans in the South 1016-1130. Longmans: London, 1967.
Norwich, John Julius. The Kingdom in the Sun 1130-1194. Longman: London, 1970.
Chalandon, Ferdinand. Histoire de la domination normande en Italie et en Sicile. Paris, 1907. 

Norman conquest of southern Italy
Medieval Sicily
Italo-Norman families